Forma Ideale is a Serbian home furnishing manufacturer and retailer headquartered in Kragujevac, Serbia.

History
The company was established in 1995 under the name "EL-EN", in Kragujevac, FR Yugoslavia. In 2001, it opened its first store in Serbia. As of 2017, it was the largest Serbian furniture manufacturer by worth of exports.

In August 2018, Forma Ideale bought from bankruptcy Kragujevac-based company "Metal sistemi" for 4.7 million euros.

As of 2018, Forma Ideale is among the largest furniture manufacturers in Serbia, and has sales network in 35 countries worldwide. Also, it is among the largest companies in Kragujevac and Šumadija District by revenue and export worth (as of 2018). 

In January 2019, the European Bank for Reconstruction and Development became the minority shareholder in the company after acquiring 16.72% of shares for 10 million euros.

Subsidiaries
 Sofa Style d.o.o.
 Green Field Invest d.o.o.
 Forma Real Estate Rent 1 d.o.o.

References

External links
 

1995 establishments in Serbia
Companies based in Kragujevac
Manufacturing companies established in 1995
Retail companies established in 2001
Furniture companies of Serbia
Furniture retailers of Serbia
Serbian brands